Seyyed Karim Hosseini (born: 1969, Ahwaz) is a principlist representative of Ahwaz in the Islamic Consultative Assembly who was elected on 21 February 2020.

Hosseini who is an Ahwazi Arab Seyyed, is a university lecturer and general practitioner. He has managerial backgrounds in the Ministry of Health, Khuzestan Governor's Office, Martyr Foundation and Social Security. Seyyed-Karaim served in the presidential elections (and also city council elections) in 2017 as the head of staff of Ebrahi-Ra'isi in the province of Khuzestan. He is also the spokesman of Popular Front of Islamic Revolution Forces. He was the head of "Amirkabir-Hospital" in the city of Ahvaz for several years; currently, he is active as the Shahid-Rajaei polyclinic's chief.

See also 
 Foundation of Martyrs and Veterans Affairs
 Popular Front of Islamic Revolution Forces
 Seyyed Lefteh Ahmad Nejad
 Seyyed Mohammad Molavi
 Jalil Mokhtar
 Seyyed Mojtaba Mahfouzi
 Mojtaba Yousefi (politician)

References

1969 births
Living people
Members of the Islamic Consultative Assembly by term
Members of the 11th Islamic Consultative Assembly
People from Ahvaz